The Chair of St Augustine or Cathedra Augustini (Latin) is the ceremonial enthronement cathedra chair of the Archbishop of Canterbury in Canterbury Cathedral, Kent.

History
Named after the first Archbishop of Canterbury, St Augustine of Canterbury, the chair is made of Petworth marble. The current chair, documented in the Cathedral's accounts as made between 1201 and 1204, replaced one that was destroyed in the fire of 1174, however, its base may contain fragments of the original chair, which is mentioned in the descriptions of Eadmer and Gervase of Canterbury of the Anglo-Saxon and Romanesque buildings. According to the cathedral the chair was once part of the furnishings of the shrine of St Thomas Becket, which was destroyed during the English Reformation. The original chair was described by Eadmer as "the pontifical chair, constructed with handsome workmanship and of large stones and cement"; it stood in the western apse behind the altar of St Mary but perished in the fire of 1067.

Since an early period, it has always had a place in the triple enthronement of an Archbishop of Canterbury. He is seated on the throne in the choir as Diocesan Bishop, in the chapter house as titular abbot, and in St. Augustine's chair as Primate of All England. This and the Lambeth Conference are the only occasions in which this cathedra is used. The choir throne is used for other occasions in which the archbishop is present.

Modern meaning
Given the worldwide nature of the modern Anglican Communion, the enthronement in St Augustine's Chair has come to represent also the Archbishop of Canterbury's position as worldwide spiritual leader of the Communion; because of this it has become traditional following the enthronement in the Chair of St Augustine by the Dean of Canterbury for the new Archbishop to be blessed by the senior Primatial Archbishop (by length of service in office) from around the world; for example, Rowan Williams was blessed by the then Archbishop of Armagh, Robin Eames, while Justin Welby was blessed by Archbishop of Burundi Bernard Ntahoturi, who gave his blessing in French.

References

Canterbury Cathedral
Individual thrones
Marble sculptures in the United Kingdom